"Double Tap" is a single by industrial metal band Ministry. It was the second single from the album Relapse, released on February 24, 2012. The song is about "Operation Geronimo". It is fast-paced, like many other Ministry songs.

Track listing
"Double Tap" – 4:06

References

External links
 "Double Tap" Song Lyrics
 "Double Tap" Music Video

2012 singles
2012 songs
Ministry (band) songs